Chauncey B. Seaton (March 14, 1848 - December 2, 1896) was an architect in the U.S. He was born near Bucyrus, Ohio, studied at Wooster University and then at a technical school in Chicago. 

He worked as an architect in Selma, Alabama before returning to Chicago and working in St. Paul, Minnesota. He ventured out to what was then known as Spokane Falls after the Great Spokane Fire and designed the Spokesman-Review building in Spokane, Washington in 1890. Some sources credit him with the Northwest Industrial Exposition Building constructed in 1890, but others credit Richard H. Martin, Jr.

C. Ferris White worked with him.

Spokane-Review building
After the Spokane Fire of 1889, Chauncey B. Seaton designed the Spokane-Review building with an irregular shape to fit the shape of the lot. He left Spokane before the Spokesman-Review building was completed. It housed both the Spokesman-Review and the Spokane Daily Chronicle, both owned by Cowles of the Cowles Company, until the Daily Chronicle Building was completed next door in 1928.

He died December 2, 1896 after a long period of illness.

Work
Spokane Falls Review building (The Spokesman-Review building)
Northwest Industrial Exposition building (burned)
State Normal School at Cheney (destroyed in the 1891 State Normal School at Cheney fire)
Pioneer block of Boise
H. B. Wadsworth residence
H. M. Stephens residence 
Rufus Merriam residence 
W R. Orndorff residence 
J. H. Vagin residence 
Six cottages for E. L. Shannon 
McQuillan Block in St. Paul, Minnesota

References

1848 births
19th-century American architects
1896 deaths
People from Bucyrus, Ohio